Electrical Transient Analyzer Program (ETAP) is an electrical network modeling and simulation software tool used by power systems engineers to create an "electrical digital twin" and analyze electrical power system dynamics, transients and protection.

Dr. Farrokh Shokooh is the founder of ETAP. While Dr. Shokooh worked at Fluor Corporation he was made in charge of selecting electrical engineering software. Realizing a lack of comprehensive, efficient and intelligent power system analysis software, the vision of Electrical Transient Analyzer Program (ETAP) was born. Dr. Shokooh left Fluor Corporation to develop ETAP and founded Operation Technology, Inc (OTI) in 1986. OTI dba ETAP is an ISO 9001-certified electrical power system design and automation software company headquartered in Irvine, California, with international offices in India, UAE, KSA, Brazil, Mexico, France, UK, Malaysia and China.

Schneider Electric took controlling stake in ETAP on November 16, 2020 to spearhead smart and green electrification. The current CEO of ETAP is Tanuj Khandelwal who previously held the role of CTO and has been employed at ETAP for over 20 years.

ETAP was developed for utilization on MS-DOS operating system and intended for commercial and nuclear power system analysis  and system operations.

Power system simulation requires an electrical digital twin consisting of a power system network model that includes system connectivity, topology, electrical device characteristics, historical system response and real-time operations data in order to make offline or online decisions. ETAP power engineering software utilizes an electrical digital twin in order for electrical engineers and operators to perform following studies in offline or online mode.

References 

Simulation software
Electric power distribution